Fort Benton High School is a high school in Fort Benton, Montana.

The district serves students living in Fort Benton, Loma, and Carter, with total population nearing 2,000 people.  The sports teams are called the Mighty Longhorns.

About the school 

The total 2010-2011 enrollment for grades kindergarten through 12th grade was 553 students.

The high school building was built in 1943, after a fire destroyed the original building that was built in the summer of 1920.

The Fort Benton School district has had 5 separate building  with the Original building built 1856 and then the separate building after the fire was built in 1920 the Elementary and High School that housed Chouteau County High School and then the current Elementary and High School that houses Fort Benton High School built in 1963.

Athletics 

The Fort Benton Longhorns have had to move with the economy with what District, Division, and Classification they are placed in. Being one of the original founding schools in the MHSA, 
Classifications:
 Class AA 1891-1931
 Class A 1932-1977
 Class B 1978-1982
 Class A 1983-1988
 Class B 1989-2008
 Class C 2009-Current
 Central A
 Northern A
 Northeast B
 Northern B
 Southern B
 South/Central B
 Northern C
 District 1B
 District 6B
 District 7C/8C
 District 9C

Football 
The Longhorn Football team holds the longest running state playoff record out of all Class A' B' and C' Schools 20 state playoff shows from the Longhorns.
 State Championships: 2002,
 State Runner-Up: 2003, 2004

Volleyball 
Fort Benton Volleyball

 State Champions: 
 State Place: 
 Division Champions: 2019, 2010, 1993, 1992
 Division Place: 4th-2009, 4th-2008, 3rd-2007
 District Champions: 1993, 1992, 1991
 District Place: 2nd-2019 3rd-2010 2nd-2009, 4th-2008, 3rd-2007, 2nd-2006

Boys' Basketball 
State Champions: 1953, 1952, 1951
State Place: 3rd/4th-2020 3rd-1973, 2nd-1972, 2nd-1956, 2nd-1955, 2nd-1954, 2nd-1950
Division Champions: 2020, 1973, 1972, 1956, 1955, 1954, 1953, 1952, 1951, 1950
Division Place: 4th-2006
District Champions: 2020, 2010, 2006, 
District Place: 2nd-2019 3rd-2018, 3rd-2009, 4th-2008, 2nd-2007, 2nd-1996, 2nd-1992, 2nd-1991,

Girls' Basketball 
State Place: 3rd-2003, 2nd-2000 
Division Champions: 2002, 2000
Division Place: 3rd-2020 3rd-2017, 2nd-2003, 2nd-1999, 3rd-1998
District Champions: 2020, 2019, 2018, 2014, 2003, 2002, 2001, 2000, 1999
District Place: 2nd-2017, 4th-2010, 4th-2009, 3rd-2007, 2nd-1998

Wrestling 
State Championships: 2013

Boys' and Girls' Track 
Boys' State Championships: 2003, 2001, 1987, 1986, 1985
Boys' Divisional Championships: 2019
Boys' District Championships: 2019
Girls' State Championships: 2017, 1997, 1983, 1982
Girls' State Place: 3rd-2019 2nd-2018
Girls' Divisional Championships: 2019, 2018, 2017, 2016
Girls' District Championships: 2019, 2018, 2017

Golf 
Boys' State Championships: 2011, 2010, 2000
Girls' State Championships: 2011, 2010, 1997, 1996, 1994, 1993, 1992

Tennis 
State Champions:
State Runner-up: 1992 1993 1994 1995 1996
Divisional Champions: Many list coming soon

Gymnastics 
Program Retired
State Championships: 1973
State Runner-ups: 1972 1974 1975 1976 1978 1979 1980

Activities 

 Cheerleading
 B Club - creates banners supporting the classes and sports teams that are displayed in the gymnasium. They are also responsible for creating locker signs for participants in athletics and activities.
 National Honor Society
 Band  - Pep band plays at almost all FBHS athletic events
 Choir
 Speech and Drama - Divisional Championships: 2014, 2013, State Championships: 2010, 1953
 Newspaper/Annual -This group is responsible for the production and quality of the Annual yearbook.

Chouteau County High School 
Fort Benton High School was originally named back in 1891 when the first building was built Chouteau County High School which served all towns in Chouteau County which the high school first had about 200 students and then after the first building burnt to the ground in 1920 and the new building currently housing the high school was built the school split into 4 high schools Highwood, Geraldine, Big Sandy, and Fort Benton.

Currently Fort Benton has two buildings. Big Sandy two, Highwood one, and Geraldine has one.

References

Public high schools in Montana
Schools in Chouteau County, Montana
1921 establishments in Montana
Educational institutions established in 1921